"Take a penny, leave a penny" (sometimes "Give a penny, take a penny", penny tray, or penny pool) refers to a type of tray, dish or cup meant for convenience in cash transactions.  They are often found in the United States in gas stations,  convenience stores, and other small stores, and were similarly common in Canada before the penny went out of circulation in 2013.

Usage
The small cup or tray near a cash register is designated as a place for people to place pennies they receive as change if they do not want these pennies.  Then, customers who, for example, need one cent for a transaction can take one of the pennies to avoid needing one of their own or breaking a higher-denomination coin or bill.  The tray can also be used by cashiers for the sake of efficiency: the cashier may take a penny (1 cent) from the tray and then give the customer, for example, one quarter (25 cents) instead of 24 cents (two dimes and four pennies, or six coins in all). These are also called "penny pools", and may be either a generic container such as a small box, or a purposely made container, perhaps with an advertisement or with text advising the customer to "take a penny, leave a penny".

See also

Honesty box
Penny debate in the United States
Cash rounding

References

Personal finance
Pennies
Money containers